Shaun Pierre Bajada (born 19 August 1983 in Sannat, Gozo, Malta) is a professional footballer currently playing for Victoria Hotspurs on loan from Xewkija Tigers, where he most frequently plays as a midfielder.

Playing career

Floriana
As a boy he had won many honours with his native village club Sannat Lions, but was a product of Floriana.

Shaun made his debut with Floriana in the Maltese Premier League in the season 2000–01. During a career spanning four seasons with Floriana, Shaun made 48 appearances and scored three goals.

Marsaxlokk
On 22 January 2005, Shaun joined Marsaxlokk. Bajada signed a four-and-a-half year contract with the club. Bajada was the first signing from the local market of the month after the club transferred Etienne Barbara to Birkirkara. Bajada arrived along with two foreigners, Bulgarian Mitko Trendafilov and Nigerian Michael Ochei.

During his time with Marsaxlokk, Shaun made 43 appearances and scored six goals.

Msida Saint-Joseph
On 25 January 2007, Peter Pullicino joined Marsaxlokk from Msida Saint-Joseph, as part of the deal Shaun Bajada was loaned to Msida Saint-Joseph until July 2007.

During this time Bajada made 11 appearances and scored one goal.

Birkirkara
Following the completion of his loan spell Msida Saint-Joseph, on 5 August 2007, Marsaxlokk and Birkirkara reached an agreement over a swap deal which saw William Camenzuli join Marsaxlokk and Bajada would join Birkirkara.

Victoria Hotspurs
On 31 January 2019 Victoria Hotspurs announced, that they had come to an agreement to exchange Bajada from Xewkija Tigers and Joseph Mario Vella from Victoria in a swap loan deal between both clubs.

International career

Malta
Shaun has played with the Maltese National Team at Under- 21 level, Under- 19 level, Under- 18 level and Under- 16 level. In January 2008 Bajada was chosen as part of the squad for the Maltese national team and he played his first match on 2 February 2008.

Personal life
 Shaun is a supporter of his local team Sannat Lions in the Gozo Football League First Division.
 Shaun also follows the fortunes of Manchester United and Juventus.

Career statistics
Statistics accurate as of match played 1 August 2013.

References

External links
 
 Shaun Bajada at Victoria Hotspurs' website

1983 births
Living people
Maltese footballers
Malta international footballers
Floriana F.C. players
Marsaxlokk F.C. players
Msida Saint-Joseph F.C. players
Birkirkara F.C. players
Valletta F.C. players
Sliema Wanderers F.C. players
People from Sannat
Maltese Premier League players
Gozo Football League First Division players
Association football midfielders